Coen may refer to:

 Coen (name), a given name and surname
 Enrico Coen (1957), a British botanist
 Coen brothers, a U.S. filmmaker sibling duo
 Coen River, Cape York Peninsula, Queensland, Australia; named after Jan Pieterszoon Coen in 1623
 Coen, Queensland, Australia; named after the Coen River
 Coen Airport (IATA airport code: CUQ; ICAO airport code: YCOE), Coen, Cook, Queensland, Australia
 Coen Carrier Station, Coleman Close, Coen, Shire of Cook, Queensland, Australia; a telegraph station
 Coen River (Costa Rica)
 Coen Tunnel, Amsterdam, Netherlands; named after Jan Pieterszoon Coen
 Second Coen Tunnel, Amsterdam, Netherlands; next to the First Coen Tunnel
 Coen Tunnel (Mingo Junction), Ohio, USA; railway tunnel 
 , Dutch passenger ship
 Coen rainbow-skink (Liburnascincus coensis), a lizard

See also

 Joachim Coens (born 1966) Belgian politician
 Élus Coëns, the Order of Knight-Masons Elect Priests of the Universe
 
 
 Coan (disambiguation)
 Cohen (disambiguation)